An American outlaw is an outlaw from the United States.

American outlaw or American Outlaws may also refer to:
 The American Outlaws, the U.S. Soccer supporters' group
 American Outlaws, the 2001 film
 Outlaws Motorcycle Club, the American Outlaws Association, a biker club